A Short Collection of Short Songs is an EP by Ohio-based pop punk band Mixtapes. It is literally a short collection of six short songs.

Track listing

Personnel
Ryan Rockwell – vocals, guitar
Maura Weaver – vocals, guitar
Michael Remley – bass
Boone Haley – drums

References

2010 EPs